Brian K. Lohse (born 27 November 1968) is an American attorney and politician. A member of the Republican Party, he was elected to the Iowa House of Representatives in 2018, succeeding Zach Nunn in District 45. Prior to his state legislative service, Lohse sat on the city council of Bondurant, Iowa, for eight years.

Early life and education
Brian Lohse was born in Zion, Illinois and raised in Amboy. After earning a Bachelor of Arts degree in social sciences from the University of Northwestern – St. Paul, Lohse graduated from Drake University Law School in 1995, and joined a legal practice in Lee County, Illinois.

Career 
After three years, Lohse returned to Iowa, working as a lawyer for EMC Insurance. In 2004, Lohse also held a second job as a newspaper carrier. In September 2012, Lohse and his wife Mary won an Iowa Powerball lottery jackpot of $202 million, at the time the state's second-largest Powerball jackpot. With the winnings, the couple established the Lohse Family Foundation, funded the construction of a high school football stadium, and opened a grocery store in their hometown of Bondurant, Iowa. After winning the lottery, Brian Lohse ended his practice of law. Mary Lohse remained a medical assistant at a Mercy Medical Center-affiliated clinic, though only on a part-time basis. In August 2022, Fareway announced that it would acquired the Brick Street Market and Café from the Lohse family.

Politics
Brian Lohse served on the Bondurant City Council for eight years before contesting Zach Nunn's open Iowa House of Representatives seat in District 30 as a Republican Party candidate. He faced Democratic Party candidate Kent Balduchi in the November 2018 general election. Lohse announced in December 2019 that he would run for reelection in 2020. He defeated Lori Slings in the general election. In the 2022 general election, Lohse ran unopposed for District 45.

Personal life 
Lohse and his wife, Mary, have two sons and one daughter.

References

1968 births
20th-century American lawyers
21st-century American lawyers
Iowa lawyers
Iowa city council members
21st-century American politicians
Republican Party members of the Iowa House of Representatives
Lottery winners
People from Polk County, Iowa
Living people
Illinois lawyers
American grocers
University of Northwestern – St. Paul alumni
People from Zion, Illinois
Drake University Law School alumni